USS Skink (SP-605) was a United States Navy patrol vessel in commission from 1917 to 1918.

Skink was built as a private motorboat of the same name by George Lawley & Son at Neponset, Massachusetts, in 1917. In 1917, the U.S. Navy acquired her from her owner, Robert D. Longyear of Cambridge, Massachusetts, for use as a section patrol boat during World War I. She was commissioned as USS Skink (SP-605) on 13 June 1917, and retrospectively formally acquired from Longyear on 30 June 1917.

Assigned to the 1st Naval District in northern New England, Skink carried out patrol duties in the Boston, Massachusetts, area for the rest of World War I.

Skink was decommissioned on 22 November 1918 and returned to Longyear on 24 February 1919.

References

Department of the Navy Naval History and Heritage Command Online Library of Selected Images: Civilian Ships: Skink (Motor Boat, 1917). Served as USS Skink (SP-605) in 1917-1919
NavSource Online: Section Patrol Craft Photo Archive Skink (SP 605)

Patrol vessels of the United States Navy
World War I patrol vessels of the United States
Ships built in Boston
1917 ships